Epinotia meritana, the white-fir needle miner, is a moth of the family Tortricidae. It is found in the western United States, including Utah, New Mexico and Arizona.

The wingspan is about 9 mm. Adults are on wing in late June and July. There is one generation per year in New Mexico and Arizona.

The larvae have been recorded on Abies concolor and Abies magnifica. They mine the needles of their host plant. The mine results in bleached-yellow mined needles. Mature larvae are about 8 mm long, yellowish-green to cream colored, with brown to black heads. Pupae are orange to dark brown, about 5.5 mm in length, and can often be seen protruding from the hole in the mined needle prior to emergence.

External links
Image
The White-Fir Needle Miner, Epinotia meritana, in Utah
Field Guide To Insects And Diseases Of Arizona And New Mexico Forests

Olethreutinae
Moths of North America
Moths described in 1923